The 2008 Biathlon Junior World Championships was held in Ruhpolding, Germany from January 26 to February 2 2008. There was to be a total of 16 competitions: sprint, pursuit, individual, mass start, and relay races for men and women.

Medal winners

Youth Women

Junior Women

Youth Men

Junior Men

Medal table

References

External links
Official IBU website 

Biathlon Junior World Championships
2008 in biathlon
2008 in German sport
International sports competitions hosted by Germany
2008 in youth sport